The New Eve (Hungarian: Az új Éva) is a painting by Hungarian artist Sándor Bortnyik from 1924.

Description
The picture is painted in oil on canvas and has dimensions of 48,5 x 38 cm. 
The picture is part of the collection of the Hungarian National Museum in Budapest, Hungary.

Analysis
In 1919, Sandor Bortnik falls among representatives of Constructivism. From 1922 to 1924 he lived in Weimar, where he met artists from the Bauhaus. Painted abstract two- and three-dimensional compositions, which subsequently adds figures and objects. In the composition "New Eve" describes an ironic ideal of "modern" man in the 1920s. Women with fashionable clothes and placed in the showroom, and can be rotated in different directions. In his right hand he holds a green apple. With this and other paintings ironic applied swipe "brave new world" of constructivism. The artist uses precise details, geometric shapes and colors that puts them in an abstract composition. Manages to deride utopian ideals, but can not avoid them because it is an active participant in shaping the "new world".

References

1924 paintings
Hungarian paintings